The 230th Coastal Division was an infantry division of the Royal Italian Army during World War II.

History 
On 20 May 1943 the 8th Marching Division was disbanded and on 1 June 1943 the command of the 230th Coastal Division was formed with the 8th Marching Division's personnel. The command arrived in Castelvetrano in Sicily on 3 July 1943 and was assigned to the XII Army Corps in the island's western part. On 10 July 1943, the day the Allied invasion of Sicily began, the 230th received two coastal regiments and one artillery regiment from the 202nd Coastal Division. The 230th Coastal Division took over responsibility from the 202nd Coastal Division for the coastal defense of the coast between Mazara del Vallo and Marsala, and added the coast between Marsala and Trapani.

Between 21 and 24 July 1943 the 230th Division was overrun by vastly superior US Army forces and was considered annihilated by the later date.

Organization 
 230th Coastal Division
 120th Coastal Regiment
 CCXLV Coastal Battalion
 CCCLXXX Coastal Battalion
 DCCCLVII Coastal Battalion
 184th Coastal Regiment
 CCCLXXXVII Coastal Battalion
 CDXVI Coastal Battalion
 CDXCVII Coastal Battalion
 43rd Coastal Artillery Regiment
 VII Coastal Artillery Group (1x 149/35 and 1x 155/36 battery)
 XX Coastal Artillery Group (1x 149/35 and 1x 155/36 battery)
 XXII Coastal Artillery Group (105/28 howitzers)
 CCXVIII Coastal Artillery Group (100/22 howitzers)
 712th Machine Gun Company
 230th Carabinieri Section
 124th Field Post Office

Commanding officers 
The division's commanding officer was:

 Generale di Divisione Egisto Conti (1 June 1943 - 24 July 1943, POW)

References 

Coastal divisions of Italy
Infantry divisions of Italy in World War II
Military units and formations established in 1943
Military units and formations disestablished in 1943